Tomas Kančelskis (born 19 August 1975 in Šiauliai) is a Lithuanian professional footballer currently playing for KFK Šiauliai.

A central defender, Kančelskis started his career with Romar Mažeikiai, where he tasted success before his twentieth birthday, as Romar won the 1993-94 A Lyga title. He joined his hometown side Kareda Šiauliai in 1994, and continued to prosper, winning both the A Lyga (1997 and 1998) and the Lithuanian Cup (1996 and 1999) twice with his new team. He also developed into an international player with Kareda, making his first appearance for Lithuania in 1995.

FBK Kaunas lured Kančelskis from their rivals in 2000, and he soon became a central figure at the S.Darius and S.Girėnas Stadium. Quickly appointed captain, he led the side to 6 A Lyga championships and a further 3 cup triumphs in seven years.

In July 2006 Kančelskis and four compatriots were granted a trial spell in Scotland with Hearts. He featured as a trialist in a 2-0 friendly win against CA Osasuna but was not offered a contract.

However, he did move to Hearts in January 2007, a 6-month loan move seeing him leave his native country for the first time in his career. He had a trial with SK Brann in 1998. Kančelskis made his competitive debut as a substitute in a 2–0 victory at Motherwell on 5 March 2007. Tomas loan deal was cancelled on 26 March 2008, and returned to his previous club.

References

External links

Appearances at londonhearts.com

1975 births
Living people
Heart of Midlothian F.C. players
Lithuanian footballers
Lithuania international footballers
Scottish Premier League players
FBK Kaunas footballers
Sportspeople from Šiauliai
Lithuanian expatriate footballers
Expatriate footballers in Scotland
FC Šiauliai players
FK Kareda Kaunas players
Association football central defenders